Sheikh Abdullah Ssekimwanyi was the first Ugandan to make a holy pilgrimage to Mecca in Saudi Arabia in the 1920s. Making a pilgrimage to Mecca is the 5th pillar or obligation of the faith Islam. On his return, he urged Muslims to stop holding the daily Dhuhuri (noon prayer on Friday). He also started translating Friday khutuba (summons) in Luganda and other local languages.  He is the founder of  Africa Muslim Community, Juma Sect, of Bukoto-Nateete.
 As of July 2009, there are an estimated 3,916,717 Muslims in Uganda.

External links
The History of Sectarian Differences Among Uganda's Muslims (Luganda)

See also
 Islam in Uganda

References

Ugandan Islamic religious leaders
Year of birth missing
Year of death missing
Ugandan Muslims